Richard Patrick Fitzgerald (September 14, 1829 – November 20, 1892) was an American politician and farmer.

Fitzgerald was born in County Tipperary, Ireland. He emigrated to the United States and settled in Bath Township, Freeborn County, Minnesota in 1857. Fitzgerald lived in Albert Lea, Minnesota with his wife and family and was a farmer. He was also involved with the banking business. Fitzgerald served in the Minnesota House of Representatives in 1875. Fitzgerald was driving to his home in Albert Lea, Minnesota when he was thrown from his horse-drawn wagon and suffered a fatal head concussion. His great-great nephew Tom J. Shea also served in the Minnesota Legislature.

References

1829 births
1892 deaths
Irish emigrants to the United States (before 1923)
People from Albert Lea, Minnesota
Businesspeople from Minnesota
Farmers from Minnesota
Members of the Minnesota House of Representatives
Road incident deaths in Minnesota